Reichertshofen is a market town and municipality in the district of Pfaffenhofen in Bavaria in Germany

The composer Willi Vogl was born in the city (1965)

References

Pfaffenhofen (district)